Our Wife is a 1931 American pre-Code Hal Roach comedy film starring Laurel and Hardy. It was directed by James W. Horne and released by Metro-Goldwyn-Mayer.

Plot
Oliver is making plans to be married to his sweetheart Dulcy (Babe London) with Stan as his best man, but the plans are thwarted when Dulcy's father (James Finlayson) sees a picture of Ollie and forbids the marriage. The couple plan to elope, and steal away at night to a Justice of the Peace. After typical Laurel and Hardy blundering, they manage to sneak the girl away from her father's house.

Ollie, his gargantuan fiancée and Stan try to cram into a tiny car Stan hired for their elopement, but Ollie had expected a "limousine". After much struggling, they finally succeed in getting themselves and a suitcase into the car. As they move off, it tilts up under the weight and Stan's head smashes through the roof. The film concludes with a cross-eyed justice (Ben Turpin) marrying Ollie to Stan.

Cast
 Stan Laurel as Stan 
 Oliver Hardy as Ollie
 Babe London as Dulcy
 James Finlayson as Dulcy's Father
 Ben Turpin as The Justice of the Peace
 Blanche Payson as The Daughter of the Justice of the Peace
 Charley Rogers as The Butler

References

External links
 
 
 
 

1931 films
1931 comedy films
American black-and-white films
Films directed by James W. Horne
Laurel and Hardy (film series)
Films with screenplays by H. M. Walker
1930s English-language films
1930s American films